The  is the players' union that represents Japanese baseball players and their interests in Nippon Professional Baseball. The organization was incorporated in 1980 and was approved as a labor union in 1985. The current union chairman is Ginjiro Sumitani and the current institute chairman is Yohei Oshima.

The JPBPA orchestrated the two-day players' strike during the 2004 NPB realignment.

See also
 Major League Baseball Players Association

References

External links
 (in Japanese)

Baseball organizations
Sports trade unions
Sports organizations of Japan
Trade unions in Japan
Trade unions established in 1980
1980 establishments in Japan